SFM Entertainment is an American television syndicator, film distributor, production company, and licensing firm established on September 29, 1969.  SFM Entertainment is known for setting up 'occasional' networks.  The name comes from the initials of the company's founders:  Walter Staab, Robert Frank, and Stanley Moger.

History
SFM Media Services started on September 29,  1969 as an independent advertising agency by Stanley Moger, Bob Frank and Walt Staab.  SFM Media started a division, SFM Entertainment (SFME), to enter the strip-programming business. SFME's first program was The Mickey Mouse Club.

During the winter of 1976-77, SFM Media Service assisted Mobil Oil in running and launching the Mobil Showcase Network.  This led to three additional companies approaching SFM on setting up their own 'occasional' networks. In 1978, SFM launched its own network, SFM Holiday Network. SFM subsequently launched the General Foods Golden Showcase Network in 1980. In 1983, SFM worked with Del Monte Foods to form an ad hoc TV network to broadcast the special Believe You Can . . . And You Can! over 100 stations on April 21, 1983 at 8 PM EST.

In 1994, SFM started up a sports marketing unit in its media services division with the hiring of Jerry Solomon as executive vice president.  In 1998, media holding company Havas purchased SFM, except for its SFM Entertainment division.

Shows distributed by SFM
Some shows distributed by SFM (past or present) include:

 The Adventures of Rin Tin Tin
 Jayce and the Wheeled Warriors
 The Mickey Mouse Club (the 1977-1978 version, including the 1975-1977 syndication of the black-and-white original series)
 The Flip Wilson Show
 Rowan & Martin's Laugh-In
 The Smothers Brothers Show
 The Adventures of Jim Bowie
 The Danny Thomas Show
 The Real McCoys
 The West Point Story (along with MGM Television)
 The Life and Legend of Wyatt Earp (1955–1961)
 the AFI 100 Years... series of TV specials
 Zoobilee Zoo (with DIC Entertainment) live action pre-school program
 Care Bears (syndicated version from 1988)
 Rainbow Brite
 Grandma Got Run Over by a Reindeer
 Make Room for Daddy
 The Joey Bishop Show
 Death Valley Days
 Mister Peepers
 Help! I'm a Fish
 The Doctors
 Edward the Seventh (British miniseries distributed in U.S. in 1979)
 Deal (a 1978 behind-the-scenes look at Let's Make a Deal)
 Good Morning World
 Lotsa Luck
 Roseanne (produced by Carsey-Werner Productions)
 The Jerry Lewis Show (1967–1969 NBC series; sketches edited from original hour-long shows into half-hour reruns)
 The Toys That Rescued Christmas (2004)
 Superstars
Battle of the Network Stars
Female Superstars
SFM I movie and documentary package
The Indomitable Teddy Roosevelt
 Pinocchio in Outer Space
Stamp of Greatness – weekly half-hour program profile those on the postage stamps
Directions – weekly half-hour program on fashion
The George Steinbrenner Show – half-hour weekly sports series moderated by Steinbrenner as two well-known sports figures debate sports related issue in front of an audience
Faces of Love – first-run anthology series from major authors feature romance
The Hugga Bunch – 5-part limited series
The Texas 150th Birthday Celebration – 3-hour live special featuring top Texan stars mark the 150th anniversary of Texas
The March of Time – award-winning British documentary series
 The Dione Lucas Cooking Show

Units
 SFM Entertainment
 SFM Holiday Network

See also
Fourth television network
Mobil Showcase Network 
Operation Prime Time

References

External links
 

Television production companies of the United States
Television syndication distributors
Entertainment companies established in 1969